József Zakariás (25 March 1924 – 22 November 1971) was a Hungarian footballer and manager. During the 1950s he was a member of the legendary Hungary team known as the Mighty Magyars. Other members of the team included Nándor Hidegkuti, Ferenc Puskás, Zoltán Czibor, Sándor Kocsis and József Bozsik.

MTK Hungária FC

Zakariás was born and died in Budapest and spent the peak of his career at MTK Hungária FC. However while he was with the club they were known as Bástya SE and then Vörös Lobogó SE.  Under coach Márton Bukovi and with a team that also included Nándor Hidegkuti, Péter Palotás and Mihály Lantos, Zakariás helped MTK win two Nemzeti Bajnokság I titles, a Magyar Kupa and a Mitropa Cup.

Hungarian International

Between 1949 and 1954, Zakariás won 35 caps for Hungary. As one of the legendary Mighty Magyars, he helped Hungary become Olympic Champions in 1952, Central European Champions in 1953 and defeated England twice. He then helped Hungary reach the 1954 World Cup final. During the World Cup finals he played in four of the five games Hungary played in. He allegedly broke a curfew before the final, spending the previous night with a hotel maid. Zakariás never played for Hungary again.

Honours

Hungary
Olympic Champions
1952
Central European Champions
1953
World Cup
Runner-up: 1954

MTK/Bástya/Vörös Lobogó

Hungarian Champions: 2
1953, 1958
Magyar Kupa: 1
1952
Mitropa Cup: 1
1955

References

Sources
Behind The Curtain – Travels in Eastern European Football: Jonathan Wilson (2006)

External links
 Hungary stats

1924 births
1971 deaths
Footballers from Budapest
Hungarian footballers
MTK Budapest FC players
Hungarian football managers
Footballers at the 1952 Summer Olympics
Olympic footballers of Hungary
Olympic gold medalists for Hungary
1954 FIFA World Cup players
Hungary international footballers
Olympic medalists in football
Medalists at the 1952 Summer Olympics
Guinea national football team managers
Burials at Farkasréti Cemetery
Association football midfielders
Hungarian expatriate sportspeople in Guinea
Expatriate football managers in Guinea